was a Japanese artist best known as a painter and a designer of ukiyo-e woodblock prints. He was self-taught in art, and won numerous national and international prizes and was one of the earliest Japanese artists to win an international audience.

Biography

He was born as Nakagami Shōnosuke (名鏡 正之助) in Kyōbashi Yazaemon-chō in Edo (modern Tokyo) in 1859.  His father, tradesman Nakagami Seijirō (名鏡 清次郎), died in 1876, and Gekkō took to work in a lantern shop in Kyōbashi Yumi-chō.

Gekkō was self-taught in art, and began decorating porcelain and rickshaws, and designing flyers for the pleasure quarters.  His early style shows the influence of the painter Kikuchi Yōsai.  About 1881 he took the surname Ogata at the insistence of a descendant of the painter Ogata Kōrin.  He soon was designing prints and illustrating books and newspapers.  In 1885 Gekkō exhibited in the Painting Appreciation Society, and he became acquainted with the art scholars Ernest Fenellosa and Okakura Kakuzō.

In 1886 Gekkō produced the print series Gekkō Zuihitsu ("Gekkō’s Random Sketches"). In 1888, he married an art student of his, Tai Kiku—his second marriage—and changed his family name to Tai. The First Sino-Japanese War was the subject of a number of triptychs he designed in 1894–95.

From the 1890s Gekkō won a number of  art prizes, both national and international. He was one of the earliest Japanese artists to win international attention. His work was exhibited at the Exposition Universelle in Paris in 1900 and at the Japan-British Exhibition in London in 1910. In 1898 at the Japan Art Association, Emperor Meiji bought his painting  ("Night Attack of the Soga"). He won third prize at the sixth  in 1912.

Gekkō died on 1 October 1920 in Shin-Ogawamachi in Ushigome Ward of Tokyo at age 61.  His art names include Kagyōrō, Meikyōsai, Kiyū, and Rōsai.  He had few students, the best-known of whom was Kōgyo Tsukioka, the adopted son of Yoshitoshi.

Style

His work was originally closely based upon that of Kikuchi Yōsai; and he was inspired by Hokusai, creating a series of one hundred prints of Mount Fuji. However, he did develop his own style, with significant stylistic elements from nihonga.

Gekkō was among the artists whose artwork informed the Japanese populace about the progress of naval and land war known today as the First Sino-Japanese War of 1894-1895.  A number of Gekko's war images were published in Seishin Bidan by Yokoyama Ryohachi.

An impression of the Haiyang Island (Kaiyoto) Naval Battle in 1894 was prepared in a large-scale quadruptich format.

Among the widely circulated Sino-Japanese triptych images of the war which were created by Gekkō include:
 Japanese Officers and Soldiers Fight Bravely at Fenghuangcheng
 The Japanese First Army Advances Toward Mukden
 The Japanese Navy Victorious Off Takushan
 Captain Osawa and Six Others From the Warship Yaeyama Close in on Yungcheng Bay
 Presenting a Portentous Eagle to the Emperor
 Popular Viewing of the Captured Chinese Warship Chenyuen
 Japanese and Chinese Dignitaries Accomplish Their Missions in Successfully Concluding a Peace Treaty

Selected works
Ogata Gekkō's published work encompasses 46 works in 48 publications in 2 languages and 68 library holdings.

 1905 – 夢の三郎 (Yume no Saburō) OCLC 229891974
 1898 – 月耕画圃 (Gekkō gaho) 
 1895 – 以呂波引月耕漫画 (Irohabiki Gekkō manga) OCLC 046354614
 1885 – 新說小簾の月 (Shinsetsu osu no tsuki) OCLC 033798610

Gallery

See also
 War artist

References

Works cited
 
 Keene, Donald; Anne Nishimura Morse; Frederic A Sharf and Louise E Virgin. (2001). Japan at the Dawn of the Modern Age: Woodblock Prints from the Meiji Era, 1868–1912. Boston: Museum of Fine Arts. ; ;   OCLC 249920897
 Lane, Richard. (1978).  Images from the Floating World, The Japanese Print. Oxford: Oxford University Press. ;  OCLC 5246796
 Nussbaum, Louis Frédéric and Käthe Roth. (2005). "Ogata Gekkō" in Japan Encyclopedia. Cambridge: Harvard University Press. ; OCLC 48943301

External links 

Ogata Gekkō Meiji Master
 https://ukiyo-e.org/artist/ogata-gekko
Works at Shogun Gallery
YosaiSchool Ryozanpaku

Ukiyo-e artists
1859 births
1920 deaths
19th-century Japanese painters
20th-century Japanese painters
20th-century printmakers